Cristian Díaz may refer to:

 Cristian Díaz (footballer, born 1976), Argentine former football defender
 Cristian Díaz (footballer, born 1989), Argentine former football defender
 Cristian Díaz (footballer, born 1993), Venezuelan football forward
 Cristian Omar Díaz (born 1986), Argentine football forward
 Christian Díaz (born 1976), Argentine former football defender and manager